The 14th Houston Film Critics Society Awards were announced virtually on January 18, 2021, at the Museum of Fine Arts, Houston, Texas, United States. The nominations were announced on January 12, 2021.

Winners and nominees
Winners are listed first and highlighted with boldface

References

2020
2020 film awards
2020 in Texas
Houston